Gabriel Michel Hippolyte Matzneff (born 12 August 1936) is a French writer. He was the winner of the Mottard and Amic awards from the Académie française in 1987 and 2009 respectively, the Prix Renaudot essay in 2013 and the Prix Cazes in 2015. 

He described his pedophile and sexual tourism activities in several of his books as well as on his official website, and discussed them on television appearances. Nonetheless, he remained sheltered from any criminal prosecution throughout his literary career and benefited from wide and enthusiastic support within the French literary world—all despite the fact that his books did not sell well among the general public.

On 11 February 2020, French prosecutors announced that a criminal investigation had been launched. Matzneff was summoned to appear before a Paris court the following day. Due to the statute of limitations, the investigation will likely be closed without legal consequences.

Biography

Family, youth and education
Matzneff came from a family of Russian émigrés who settled in France after 1917. According to information available on his official website, "his parents divorced when he was six months old; throughout his childhood, he never saw them in the same room, and would often be separated from his sister Alexandra and his brothers André and Nicolas. His mother was Jewish, while his father was Russian. He was raised in Russian Orthodoxy. It was a childhood tossed to and fro, overshadowed by family breakdowns and war. It was a childhood which still causes him very painful memories."

His family raised him in a refined cultural  environment, rubbing shoulders with such famous Russian figures as Lev Shestov and Nikolai Berdyaev. It is here he discovered literature and religion. Matzneff spent a year attending the Gerson private Catholic school (1943–1944), two in Lycée Saint-Louis-de-Gonzague (1944–1946), then moved to a school in Tannenberg from between 1946 and 1952, and from 1952 attended Lycée Carnot. In 1954 he commenced his studies on classical letters and philosophy at the Sorbonne. After completing his military service in Algeria between 1959 and 1960, Matzneff returned to Paris in 1961. He enrolled as a Russian speaker at the Institut national des langues et civilisations orientales and began a career as a journalist.

He met Henry de Montherlant in June 1957 and remained his friend, in spite of quarrels, until de Montherlant's suicide in 1972.

He began to keep his diary on 1 August 1953 but did not publish it until 1976. In the first volume, he vowed himself to be a rebel sentimental libertine: "I was Athos, the great misanthrope lord, secret, different...".

Literary career

In October 1962, the publication director of Combat, who had noticed his work, asked him to write a column for his daily. During the following decades, Matzneff was to be a regular or occasional columnist for several newspapers and magazines of all political stripes, including Le Quotidien de Paris, Le Figaro and Le Monde. From 2013 to December 2019, he kept an irregular column on the web edition of Le Point.

In October 1964 he took part in the founding congress of the Coordinating Committee of Orthodox youth, where he met the high school student Tatiana Scherbatcheff. He married her on 8 January 1970 in London before divorcing on 3 March 1973. This divorce caused him a crisis of faith which moved him away from the Church; he then left the Committee and ceased co-production of the television program Orthodoxy which he had helped to create in May 1965.

His first book, Le Défi, a collection of essays, was published in 1965. The following year he published his first novel, L'Archimandrite, which he had begun writing during his military service. During the 1970s, he made a number of trips to the Middle East as well as to Poland and the Soviet Union. During the 1980s, he made several trips to the Philippines where, as he described in one of his books, he raped pre-adolescent boys that he had picked up at Harrison Plaza, Manilla's main shopping center.

The critic Pol Vandromme wrote in 1974 that he was "the most notable writer of his generation".

In 1990, Matzneff joined Gallimard with the help of Philippe Sollers, who published his 1979–1982 collection of diary entries, "Les Soleils révolus". Gallimard paid monthly royalties to Matzneff until 2004.

Gallimard, the leading French publishing group and Matzneff's historical publisher for 30 years, abruptly stopped marketing the author's books in early January 2020 and recalled his books from bookstores, less than two months after having published L'Amante de l'Arsenal, the last installment of Matzneff's diary. On 12 February 2020, police searched the headquarters of Éditions Gallimard looking for, among other things, unpublished manuscripts detailing Matzneff's pedophile activities.

Matzneff was the winner of the Mottard and Amic awards from the Académie française in 1987 and 2009 respectively, the Prix Renaudot for best essay in 2013 and the Prix Cazes in 2015.

Child rape

Matzneff had long described raping children in his work; his diary Un Galop d'Enfer, published in 1985, stated that whilst in the Philippines he would regularly rape underage boys. He wrote that "Sometimes, I'll have as many as four boys—from 8 to 14 years old—in my bed at the same time, and I'll engage in the most exquisite lovemaking with them." In 1990, during an appearance on the French talk show Apostrophes, he was confronted about this by Canadian writer Denise Bombardier.

Nevertheless, he remained sheltered from any criminal prosecution for decades, and benefited from broad support within the French literary world. At the end of 2019 one of his former victims, Vanessa Springora—the director of Éditions Julliard—published the book Le Consentement, describing the effect that Matzneff had on her at the age of 14. Her book ignited controversy over the tolerance of the literary milieu towards an admitted pedophile. This led Éditions Gallimard to withdraw their marketing services for some of his works, in particular Carnets noirs and Les Moins de seize ans, with other publishers to follow.

At the beginning of 2020, the Paris prosecutor's office opened an investigation against Matzneff for "rape of a minor under the age of 15". According to newspaper reports in October 2021, unless there is a new development, the investigation will likely be closed without legal consequences due to the statute of limitations.

Work

Diaries
The original title of the series, until 2009, was "Journal", both in editions of the Round Table, from 1976 to 1991, and in Gallimard editions, from 1990 to 2007. According to the general catalog of the National Library of France, from 2009, with the publication by Éditions Léo Scheer, the overall title was changed to: Carnets noirs ("Black Notebooks").

Black Notebooks
 
 
 
 
 
 
 
 
 
 
 
 

Journal

Novels
Gabriel Matzneff is the author of several novels with the same hero, Nil Kolytcheff. These are: Isaïe réjouis-toi; Ivre du vin perdu; Harrison Plaza; Mamma, li Turchi!; Voici venir le fiancé; La Lettre au capitaine Brunner.

 
 
  
  
  
  
 
 
 
 
  - winner of the Cazes-Brasserie Lipp prize, 2015

Essays
  - 
 
 
 
 
 . – This is a revised and expanded edition of La Caracole, a collection of texts from various sources, published between 1963 and 1986
  – reissued in the 1994 collection "La Petite Vermillon"
  – reissued in the collection "La Petite Vermillon"
 . – a collection of articles from various sources, published between 1961 and 1993
 
  – a collection of texts from various sources, published between 1962 and 2001
  – a collection of texts, from various sources, published between 1962 and 2003
  & mdash; a collection of 107 articles published between 1958 and 2007
  - chronicles appearances on television shows in the 1960s
  – winner of the  Renaudot Prize for essays, 2013

Stories
  – reissued in the collection "La Petite Vermillon"

Poetry
 The 37th edition of the journal Recherches, edited by Félix Guattari, contains a poem by Gabriel Matzneff in his dossier Fous d'enfance : qui a peur des pédophiles ? (which in English is "Crazy about childhood: who is afraid of pedophiles?") Other contributors: Luc Rosenzweig, Gilbert Villerot, Jean-Luc Hennig, René Schérer, Bernard Faucon, Guy Hocquenghem...), Éditions Recherches, 1979.

Bibliography 

 Lisi Cori, La Petite Fille et le Vilain Monsieur : Sur Gabriel Matzneff et le Consentement, 2021

References

1936 births
20th-century French essayists
20th-century French male writers
21st-century French essayists
21st-century French male writers
French diarists
French essayists
French people of Russian descent
Living people
Pedophile advocacy
People from Neuilly-sur-Seine
University of Paris alumni
Writers from Paris
Child sexual abuse in France
Prix Renaudot de l'essai winners